The Reaction Motors LR99 engine was the first large, throttleable, restartable liquid-propellant rocket engine. Development began in the 1950s by the Reaction Motors Division of Thiokol Chemical Company to power the North American X-15 hypersonic research aircraft. Thrust was variable from 50 to 100 percent, and the restart capability allowed it to be shut down and restarted during flight when necessary.

Design and development

After one hour of operation, the XLR99 required an overhaul. Operating times nearly twice that were recorded in tests, but declared largely unsafe. The basic X-15 aircraft carried fuel for about 83 seconds of full-powered flight, while the X-15A-2 carried fuel for just over 150 seconds. Therefore, each XLR99 was capable, in theory, of between 20 and 40 flights before an overhaul.

Like many other liquid-fuel rocket engines, the XLR99s used regenerative cooling, in that the thrust chamber and nozzle had tubing surrounding it, through which the propellant and oxidizer passed before being burned. This kept the engine cool, and preheated the fuel.

Operational history
The LR-99 was used exclusively to power the X-15 research aircraft after initial trials that used a pair of Reaction Motors XLR11s.

Applications
 North American X-15

Variants
XLR99-RM-1 prototype engines for initial testing and flight trials.
YLR99-RM-1 Service test engines fitted to X-15s for later flights.

Specifications (YLR-99-RM-1)

See also
 Reaction Motors XLR11

References

External links

 Reaction Motors XLR99 Rocket – National Museum of the United States Air Force
 XLR-99

Aircraft rocket engines
Rocket engines of the United States
Rocket engines using the gas-generator cycle